Rosa Schweninger (1849–1918) was an Austrian painter. She was a member of a Viennese family of artists, which included her father, and her brother, Carl Schweninger the Younger.

She studied at the University of Applied Arts Vienna with Frederick Sturm from 1869 to 1871. Her work includes portraits and florals.

Schweninger  exhibited her work in the rotunda of The Woman's Building at the 1893 World's Columbian Exposition in Chicago, Illinois.

The Zwei Lieder, op. 20, by Viennese composer  are dedicated to her. Schweninger's portrait of von Brukenthal is held by the Brukenthal National Museum in Sibiu, Romania.

Gallery

References

External links

 "Thoughtful"  by Rosa Schweninger
 "The Apology" by Rosa Schweninger, oil on panel, 55 x 44 cm (21 5/8 x 17 5/16in).
 Works by Rosa Schweninger, Artnet

1849 births
1918 deaths
Austrian women painters
19th-century Austrian painters
20th-century Austrian painters
19th-century Austrian women artists
20th-century Austrian women artists